The black-fronted flowerpecker (Dicaeum igniferum) is a species of bird in the family Dicaeidae. It is endemic to the Lesser Sunda Islands in Indonesia. Its natural habitats are subtropical or tropical moist lowland forest and subtropical or tropical moist montane forest.

References

black-fronted flowerpecker
Birds of the Lesser Sunda Islands
Flores Island (Indonesia)
black-fronted flowerpecker
Taxonomy articles created by Polbot